Brush Ridge is a mountain located in the Catskill Mountains of New York northeast of Fleischmanns. Monka Hill is located southeast and Belle Ayr Mountain is located south of Brush Ridge.

References

Mountains of Delaware County, New York
Mountains of New York (state)